Rede Vida (also styled as REDEVIDA) is a Brazilian Catholic television network headquartered in São José do Rio Preto, SP, covering 90% of the Brazilian territory through affiliated networks and satellite. It was founded on 1 May 1995. The channel is one of 16 commercial channels that is required for carriage on all satellite providers.

Programming
Rede Vida offers mainly Catholic programming, such as masses, novenas and rosaries, but also news, interviews, variety and sports programs. The channel broadcasts lower-division Campeonato Paulista football games (Série A2, A3 and Segunda Divisão) and Copa São Paulo.

See also
2005 in Brazilian television
Catholic television
Catholic television channels
Catholic television networks
Television in Brazil

References

Portuguese-language television networks
Television channels and stations established in 1995
Television networks in Brazil
Catholic television networks